Jerzy Christ (born September 15, 1958) is a retired Polish ice hockey centre.

Career
Christ played with Baildon Katowice from the start of his career until 1983, he then played one year for GKS Katowice in 1984. For 1984-85, he joined Polonia Bytom, and played for them until joining Zurcher SC of the National League A for part of the 1989 season. Christ then joined ECD Sauerland, and played for them until 1994. He played for ERC Westfalen Dortmund 90 for the 1994-95 season, before joining Iserlohner EC in 1995. Christ played for Iserlohner until he retired in 1997.

Christ participated in the IIHF World Championships in the 1983, 1986, 1987, and 1989 tournaments, and at the Winter Olympics in 1984 and 1988.

Statistics

References

External links

1958 births
Living people
Baildon Katowice players
GKS Katowice (ice hockey) players
Ice hockey players at the 1984 Winter Olympics
Ice hockey players at the 1988 Winter Olympics
Iserlohn Roosters players
Olympic ice hockey players of Poland
Polish ice hockey forwards
TMH Polonia Bytom players
Sportspeople from Katowice
ZSC Lions players